In computing, fc (File Compare) is a command-line program in DOS, IBM OS/2 and Microsoft Windows operating systems, that compares multiple files and outputs the differences between them. It is similar to the Unix commands comm, cmp and diff.

History
The fc command has been included in Microsoft operating systems since MS-DOS 2.11 (e.g. on the 1984/85 DEC Rainbow release) and is included in all versions of Microsoft Windows. fc has also been included in IBM OS/2 Version 2.0.

DR DOS 6.0 includes an implementation of the  command.

The command is also available in FreeDOS. This implementation is licensed under the GPLv2+.

Functionality
fc can compare text files as well as binary files. The latest versions can compare ASCII or Unicode text. The result of comparisons are output to the standard output. The output of fc is intended primarily to be human readable and may be difficult to use in other programs.

See also
 Data comparison
 comp (command)
 List of DOS commands

References

Further reading

External links

fc | Microsoft Docs
Open source FC implementation that comes with MS-DOS v2.0

DOS software
External DOS commands
File comparison tools
Microsoft free software
OS/2 commands
Windows administration